Temple Reef is an artificial reef off the coast of Pondicherry, India. It was constructed of fully recycled materials such as concrete blocks, rocks, trees, palm leaves, and iron bars by the Temple Adventures team starting from October 2013. Temple Reef Foundation currently maintains and monitors the reef.

Etymology
The reef was named both after its creator, Temple Adventures, and the shape of the site on the ocean floor. The current dive site is now divided into four different sites:

1) Original Temple Reef

2) Parking Lot

3) Beer Garden

4) Temple 2 aka Wreck City

Location

Biodiversity
Within a short span of time, the reef became home to a diverse aquatic life. There is a vast range of corals and fishes like groupers, lion fish, kingfish, eagle and manta rays, moray eels, sea snakes, triggerfish, parrot fish, angelfish, bannerfish, butterflyfish and crustaceans. Overall there has been 75 + different species recorded in this site. Some other marine life are: Malabar Grouper, Red Snapper, Blue line Grouper, Coral Banded Shrimp, Dancing Durban Shrimp, Spearing Mantis Shrimp, Humphead Batfish, Roundface Batfish, Zebra Batfish, Chevron Barracuda, Yellowtail Barracuda, Yellow Boxfish, Blue Spot Toby, Titan Triggerfish, Indian Vagabond Butterfly fish, Harlequin Sweetlips, Longfin Bannerfish, Blue tang surgeonfish Bronzelined Rabbitfish, Eyestripe Surgeonfish, Gold-lined spinefoot, Cleaner wrasse, Three spot Dascyllus, Blue ring angel fish, Yellowtail Chromis, Sargent fish, Copper Sweepers, Ring tailed Cardinalfish, Brown Lionfish, Chinese Trumpetfish, Salmacis Belli, Honeycomb Moray Eel, Moray Eels, Garden Eels, Porcupine Puffer fish, Blackspotted pufferfish, Peacock sole, Yellowspot Goatfish, Jackfish, Mackerels, Valenciennea Goby, Amblyeleotris Goby, Yellow Prawn Goby, Red Lionfish, Clearfin Lionfish, Pterois mombasae Lionfish.

See also

Artificial reef
Redbird Reef
Osborne Reef
Biorock
Marine debris
Multi-purpose reef

References

External links
Temple Adventures

Artificial reefs
Reefs of the Indian Ocean
Ecosystems
Buildings and structures completed in 2013
2013 establishments in Puducherry